Courtney Oswald Browne (born 7 December 1970) is a former English-born cricketer. He is a right-handed wicketkeeping batsman.  He is the only West Indian Test cricketer to have been born in England.

Browne was captaining Barbados when he got his first call up to the West Indies side in April 1995. He struggled to hold his place in the side and after 13 Tests he was dropped and didn't return until 3 years later for the ICC Knockout tournament in Kenya. He was soon dropped again, replaced by Ridley Jacobs. His career seemed over but he got a surprise recall for the 2004 ICC Champions Trophy in England. He was the hero in the final, his partnership with Ian Bradshaw saw them home at The Oval. After a year as first choice keeper he decided this time to leave on his own terms, retiring for 'personal reasons'.

He is a former captain of LIME Sports Club, and competed in the Barbados Cricket Association Division 1 championship.

References

1970 births
Barbados cricketers
Living people
Barbadian cricketers
West Indies One Day International cricketers
West Indies Test cricketers
Cricketers at the 1996 Cricket World Cup
People from the London Borough of Lambeth
Cricketers from Greater London
Wicket-keepers